Atteva yanguifella is a moth of the Attevidae family. It is found in China (Xizang).

The length of the forewings is 13.5-17.5 mm. The forewings are orange to orange-brown with 25 to 35 white markings scattered throughout. The hindwings are orange.

Etymology
The species name is derived from Yanguifei, one of the four legendary beauties in Chinese history, and refers to the beautiful coloration of the species.

References 

Moths described in 2013
Attevidae